List of multiple sclerosis organizations in different countries around the world.

International 
Multiple Sclerosis International Federation

Australasia

Australia 
 MS Research Australia

Europe

United Kingdom 
Multiple Sclerosis Society of Great Britain
Multiple Sclerosis Trust

North America

Canada 
 Multiple Sclerosis Society of Canada

United States 
 Fly for MS
 Multiple Sclerosis Foundation
Myelin Repair Foundation
National Multiple Sclerosis Society

References

Multiple sclerosis